Sunny Singh may refer to:

 Sunny Singh (writer) (born 1969),  Indian writer
 Sunny Singh (actor) (born 1988), Indian actor
 Sunny Singh (cricketer) (born 1986), Indian cricketer
 Sunny Singh, fictional character in the 1993 Hindi sitcom Dekh Bhai Dekh
 Sunny Singh, child actor in the 1996 film English Babu Desi Mem
 Sunny Singh, associate of George Naicker (1919–1998), Tamil political activist in South Africa
 Sunny Singh (filmographer) (born 1986), American filmographer, programmer and music archivist under the name Hate5six
 Sukhjit Singh (born 1996), English cricketer

See also
 Sunil Singh (disambiguation)